Cacia imitatrix is a species of beetle in the family Cerambycidae. It was described by Heller in 1923. It is known from the Philippines.

References

Cacia (beetle)
Beetles described in 1923
Insects of the Philippines